William Paca (October 31, 1740 – October 13, 1799) was a Founding Father of the United States who was a signatory to the Continental Association and the United States Declaration of Independence. He was a Maryland delegate to the First Continental Congress and the Second Continental Congress, governor of Maryland, and a district judge of the United States District Court for the District of Maryland.

Early life

Born on October 31, 1740, in Abingdon, Province of Maryland, British America, Paca entered school at the Philadelphia Academy and Charity School in 1752, and went on to attend the College of Philadelphia (now the University of Pennsylvania), graduating in 1759 with a Bachelor of Arts degree. He was also to receive a Master of Arts degree from the same institution in 1762, though this required no further study, only that Paca request it and be in good standing. He also attended the Inner Temple in London and read law in 1761 with Stephen Bordley and was admitted to the bar that year. Paca entered private practice in Annapolis starting in 1763.

Paca was the child of John Paca (c. 1712 – 1785), a wealthy planter in the area of English heritage, and his wife Elizabeth Smith (?-c. 1766). He was the second son of the family, after his elder brother Aquila, and had five sisters. He courted Mary Chew, the daughter of a prominent Maryland planter, and they were married on May 26, 1763. They had three children, though only their son John Philemon survived into adulthood.

Political career 
Paca was a member of the lower house of the Maryland Proprietary Assembly from 1767 to 1774. He was a delegate to the First Continental Congress and the Second Continental Congress from Maryland from 1774 to 1779. He was a signer of the United States Declaration of Independence in 1776. He was a member of the Maryland Senate from 1776 to 1777, and from 1778 to 1780. He was a judge of the Maryland General Court in 1778. He was a judge of the Court of Appeals in Cases of Capture from 1780 to 1782. He was governor of Maryland from 1782 to 1785. He was a member of the Maryland House of Delegates in 1786. He was influential in establishing Washington College in Chestertown, Maryland, in 1786. He was a delegate to the Maryland State Convention of 1788, to vote whether Maryland should ratify the proposed Constitution of the United States.

Among the other young lawyers in Annapolis at the time was Samuel Chase, who became a close friend and political colleague of Paca. Paca and Chase led local opposition to the British Stamp Act of 1765 and established the Anne Arundel County chapter of the Sons of Liberty.

Federal judicial service

He was nominated to the same position by President Washington on February 8, 1790. He was confirmed by the United States Senate on February 10, 1790, and received his commission the same day. 

Paca's career on the federal bench had a significant impact on the admiralty jurisdiction of the Federal courts and what was to become the principal business of the Supreme Court over the subsequent four decades. As the first federal judge for the District Court of Maryland, he rendered an opinion on the case of Betsey that had far reaching consequences when it was overturned by the Supreme Court. In that case, Paca argued on solid precedents of international and British law that the District Court did not have jurisdiction over the awarding of prizes brought into American ports by foreign privateers. The Supreme Court asserted otherwise in seriatim opinions and established an exclusive jurisdiction over prize cases vested in the Federal District Courts that took that privilege away from what had been the responsibility of foreign consulates. Paca's opinion was the first District Court opinion to be published, and although ultimately reversed, it provides insight into the extensive legal training of a signer of the Declaration of Independence and an author/compiler of several provisions of what became the Bill of Rights.

Death and legacy

Paca's judicial service terminated on October 13, 1799, due to his death at his estate of Wye River, in Queen Anne's County, Maryland, and was interred in a family cemetery on the estate.

Paca was admitted as an honorary member of The Society of the Cincinnati in the state of Maryland in 1783.  "The resolution conferring the honor, adopted November 22, 1783, reads in part: ... In consideration of the abilities, merit, patriotism of His Excellency, Governor Paca, this society direct that Secretary-General Williams wait on His Excellency and inform him that this society do themselves the honor to consider him as an honorary member."  He later served as the vice president of the Maryland Society from 1784-1787.  Unlike hereditary members, honorary members are not eligible to be represented by a living descendant.

His Annapolis home, the Paca House and Garden, was added to the National Register of Historic Places and designated a National Historic Landmark in 1971. The William Paca Club in New Providence, New Jersey, is named in his honor. The club cites the fact that Paca was the only Italian-American besides Caesar Rodney  to sign the Declaration of Independence as the reason for bestowing him this honor. Paca-Carroll House at St. John's College is named for Paca and fellow signer of the Declaration of Independence, Charles Carroll.

Alleged Italian ancestry

Paca has been described as being of Italian ancestry, from Abruzzo.<ref>Maryland, The Seventh State Website for the book Maryland, The SeventhcalebJohn T. Marck, author; accessed March 13, 2008.</ref>The Italian-American Web-site of New York "William Paca;" accessed March 13, 2008P.S. 155 Playground, William Paca School History New York City Department of Parks and Recreation Web-site; accessed: March 13, 2008. According to Stanley South, "[t]he rumor that the name was Italian came from a remark made in 1911 by James Cardinal Gibbons of Baltimore, who commented that he thought a relationship existed between Paca and the Italian family Pecci". In a July 18, 1937, letter to the New York Times'', a self-described descendant of Paca claimed:The ancestors of William Paca were of Italian and English origin. The name is said to have originally been spelled Pacci [sic].
However, in an interview with Giovanni Schiavo, the letter writer apparently attributed the suggestion that the name was Pecci to Cardinal Gibbons. Schiavo also reported that Paca mentioned Pope Leo XIII, whose surname was Pecci, during the interview. Stiverson and Jacobsen reported that spellings of the surname of William Paca's immigrant ancestor Robert include Peaker, Pecker, Peaca, Peca, and Paka. Neither "Pecci" nor "Pacci" (nor "Pacca") are attested, but that could be attributed to the fact that the Italian spelling of the name would have simply been difficult or unfamiliar to the English-speaking clerks of the time.

If the Paca family did have Italian origins, they were distant. William Paca's father John Paca was born in Maryland, as was his grandfather Aquila Paca (c.1675 - 1721). His great-grandfather Robert Paca was born in England in 1632, arrived in Maryland by 1651 and may also have gone by the surname "Peaker."

See also
 Colonial families of Maryland
 Memorial to the 56 Signers of the Declaration of Independence

Note

References

Sources

External links

 
 Biography by Rev. Charles A. Goodrich, 1856
 
 Paca, William (1740–1799), Maryland Online Encyclopedia, Maryland State Department of Education
 The Society of the Cincinnati

1740 births
1799 deaths
Continental Congressmen from Maryland
Governors of Maryland
University of Pennsylvania alumni
Signers of the Continental Association
Signers of the United States Declaration of Independence
Judges of the United States District Court for the District of Maryland
People from Abingdon, Maryland
People of Maryland in the American Revolution
Colonial politicians from Maryland
United States federal judges appointed by George Washington
18th-century American politicians
18th-century American judges
18th-century American lawyers
Maryland lawyers
United States federal judges admitted to the practice of law by reading law
Burials in Maryland
American slave owners
Founding Fathers of the United States